A statue of singer Kate Smith (1907–1986) by Marc Mellon was installed outside Philadelphia's Xfinity Live!, in the U.S. state of Pennsylvania, until 2019. The  bronze sculpture was commissioned by the Philadelphia Flyers and unveiled on October 8, 1987. It was placed into storage in 2010 because of the demolition of the Spectrum arena.

On April 21, 2019, the statue was removed due to the Flyers denouncing music performed by Smith.  Some of her other recordings had racist lyrics and the Flyers did not want to promote Kate Smith's legacy due to this fact.

See also

 1987 in art

References

1987 establishments in Pennsylvania
1987 sculptures
Bronze sculptures in Pennsylvania
Monuments and memorials in Pennsylvania
Outdoor sculptures in Philadelphia
Relocated buildings and structures in Pennsylvania
Removed statues
Sculptures of women in Pennsylvania
Statues in Pennsylvania
Philadelphia Flyers
Statues of musicians in the United States